Tournefortia, commonly known as soldierbush, is a genus of flowering plants in the borage family, Boraginaceae.

It was first published under the name Pittonia by Charles Plumier in 1703, in honour of Joseph Pitton de Tournefort. Later, Carl Linnaeus changed the name to Tournefortia, on the grounds that Tournefort was virtually unknown by his family name outside France.

Selected species 
The following species are accepted by The Plant List:

Tournefortia acutiflora M.Martens & Galeotti
Tournefortia acutifolia Willd.
Tournefortia andina Britton ex Rusby
Tournefortia andrade-limae J.I.M.Melo
Tournefortia angustiflora Ruiz & Pav.
Tournefortia argentea L. f.
Tournefortia astrotricha A.DC.
Tournefortia auroargentea Killip
Tournefortia belizensis Lundell
Tournefortia bicolor Sw.
Tournefortia breviflora DC.
Tournefortia brevilobata K. Krause
Tournefortia buchtienii Killip
Tournefortia caeciliana Loes.
Tournefortia calycina Benth.
Tournefortia candida (M. Martens & Galeotti) Walp.
Tournefortia candidula (Miers) I.M.Johnst.
Tournefortia capitata M. Martens & Galeotti
Tournefortia caracasana Kunth
Tournefortia chinchensis Killip
Tournefortia chrysantha (M. Martens & Galeotti) Walp.
Tournefortia cordifolia André
Tournefortia coriacea Vaupel
Tournefortia curvilimba Killip
Tournefortia cuspidata Kunth
Tournefortia delicatula J.S. Mill.
Tournefortia densiflora M.Martens & Galeotti
Tournefortia elongata D.N.Gibson
Tournefortia filiflora Griseb.
Tournefortia foetidissima L.
Tournefortia fruticosa Ortega
Tournefortia fuliginosa Kunth
Tournefortia gardneri A.DC.
Tournefortia gigantifolia Killip ex J.S. Mill.
Tournefortia glabra L.
Tournefortia gnaphalodes (L.) R.Br. ex Roem. & Schult.
Tournefortia gracilipes I.M.Johnst.
Tournefortia hernandesii Dunal ex A. DC.
Tournefortia hirsutissima L.
Tournefortia isabellina J.S. Mill.
Tournefortia johnstonii Standl.
Tournefortia kirkii (I.M. Johnst.) J.S. Mill.
Tournefortia lanceolata Fresen.
Tournefortia latisepala Nowicke
Tournefortia lilloi I.M. Johnst.
Tournefortia longifolia Ruiz & Pav.
Tournefortia longiloba D.N. Gibson
Tournefortia longispica J.S. Mill.
Tournefortia macrostachya Rusby
Tournefortia maculata Jacq.
Tournefortia mapirensis Lingelsh.
Tournefortia melanochaeta DC.
Tournefortia membranacea A. DC.
Tournefortia mexicana Vatke
Tournefortia microcalyx (Ruiz & Pav.) I.M. Johnst.
Tournefortia montana Lour.
Tournefortia multiflora J.S. Mill.
Tournefortia mutabilis Vent.
Tournefortia obtusiflora Benth.
Tournefortia odorata Sessé & Moc.
Tournefortia ovalifolia Rusby
Tournefortia paniculata Cham.
Tournefortia pedicellata Nash,D.
Tournefortia poliochros Spreng.
Tournefortia polystachya Ruiz & Pav.
Tournefortia psilostachya Kunth
Tournefortia puberula Baker
Tournefortia pubescens Hook. f.
Tournefortia ramonensis Standl.
Tournefortia ramosissima K. Krause
Tournefortia rubicunda Salzm. ex DC.
Tournefortia rufo-sericea Hook. f.
Tournefortia salicifolia A. DC.
Tournefortia salzmannii DC.
Tournefortia sarmentosa Lam.
Tournefortia scabrida Kunth
Tournefortia scandens Mill.
Tournefortia schiedeana G. Don
Tournefortia setacea Killip
Tournefortia sibirica L.
Tournefortia stenosepala K. Krause
Tournefortia subsessilis Cham.
Tournefortia subspicata Donn.Sm.
Tournefortia tacarcunensis A.H. Gentry & Nowicke
Tournefortia tarmensis (Krause) J.F. Macbr.
Tournefortia ternifolia Kunth
Tournefortia trichocalycina A.DC.
Tournefortia ulei Vaupel
Tournefortia umbellata Kunth
Tournefortia urceolata J.S.Mill.
Tournefortia usambarensis (Verdc.) Verdc.
Tournefortia vasquezii J.S. Mill.
Tournefortia vestita Killip
Tournefortia villosa Salzm. ex DC.
Tournefortia virgata Ruiz & Pav.
Tournefortia volubilis L.

Uses 
Tournefortia angustifolia is added to some versions of the hallucinogenic drink ayahuasca.

References

6. “Dangling In The Tournefortia” by Charles Bukowski published 2001 Black Sparrow 

 
Taxonomy articles created by Polbot